75 Rockefeller Plaza is a skyscraper on the north side of 51st Street in New York City, originally built as a northern extension to Rockefeller Center.

History
In July 1944, the Rockefellers began planning a new 16-story tower to house the Standard Oil Company (Esso), which had outgrown its lease at the nearby 30 Rockefeller Plaza. The structure was completed in 1947 in early Modernist style. It was originally known as the Esso Building. At completion, the building was the tallest completely air-conditioned building in New York City, and the first in Rockefeller Center. The building also housed Schrafft's Restaurant which had a capacity of 1,283 people, making it the largest restaurant in the world at the time. Standard Oil's successor, Exxon, moved to the newly built 1251 Avenue of the Americas in 1971.

In 1973, the heating, ventilation and air‐conditioning systems in the building were replaced, along with some upgrades to the electrical systems. After these renovations, Warner Communications (later Time Warner) leased all  of Exxon's former space, which led to the building becoming known as the Warner Communications Building. Warner initially occupied only  of space and subleased the rest to tenants including the Financial Times, Thomson-CSF, PBS, and The Economist. In December 1996, a fire at the TGI Fridays in the basement of the building led to a minor explosion in a top-floor equipment room, causing the building to be evacuated. In 2012, Time Warner indicated that they would not be renewing their space in the building due to their move to Time Warner Center, which would leave the building virtually empty in 2014.

After Time Warner vacated the space, Rockefeller Center's owners brought in RXR Realty by a $500 million, 99-year lease to manage the building's office space. As part of the deal, RXR would spend $250 million to renovate the building in a plan designed by Kohn Pedersen Fox. The renovation included a new lobby, replacement of the elevator cabs, new mechanical, electrical, plumbing and HVAC systems, and a complete façade restoration. Following the renovation, RXR secured Merrill Lynch Wealth Management as the anchor tenant in June 2016 with a  lease. The American Girl Store also signed a 2-story,  lease to relocate its flagship store from nearby Fifth Avenue. In August 2017, Austrian bank Erste Group signed a  lease in the building for their New York outpost.

Owners
The building is owned by Mohamed Al Fayed and managed and leased by RXR Realty.

References

External links
 

Rockefeller Center
Art Deco architecture in Manhattan
Art Deco skyscrapers
Skyscraper office buildings in Manhattan
Office buildings completed in 1947
1940s architecture in the United States
Carson and Lundin buildings
Modernist architecture in New York City
1947 establishments in New York City